Nonchalance is a design consultancy group in San Francisco, California, founded by Jeff Hull, Sara Thacher, and Uriah Findley. Their work focuses on interactive, immersive art installations, which they call "situational design".

The Jejune Institute
In 2008, Nonchalance created The Jejune Institute, an alternate reality game, public art installation and immersive experience that ran in San Francisco, California, from 2008 to 10 April 2011. It was funded by Hull with some of the proceeds from the sale of his father Blair Hull's financial company and had operating costs "in the low six figures" during its run, including salaries and office space.

Over the course of three years, it enrolled more than 10,000 players who, responding to eccentric flyers plastered all over the city, started the game by receiving their "induction" at the fake headquarters of the institute, located in an office building in San Francisco's Financial District.

Latitude Society
In 2015, Nonchalance opened the Latitude Society, an invite-only secret society and immersive experience. It featured a clubhouse, an arcade, and regular social events. The Latitude Society closed after one year, at least partially due to an operating cost of $3,000 per day.

SYGNYL
From 2021 to 2022, Nonchalance ran a podcast called SYGNYL, "a participatory-arts podcast" inviting the audience to participate in "small collaborative acts in the real world."

Awards
The Jejune Institute won "Best World" and "Best Story" at Indiecade 2010, and "Best Alternate Reality" in the SF Bay Guardian's "Best of the Bay 2010".

References

Immersive entertainment
San Francisco Bay Area
IndieCade winners